Ultrasonography of suspected or previously confirmed chronic venous insufficiency of leg veins is a risk-free, non-invasive procedure. It gives information about the anatomy, physiology and pathology of mainly superficial veins. As with heart ultrasound (echocardiography) studies, venous ultrasonography requires an understanding of hemodynamics in order to give useful examination reports. In chronic venous insufficiency, sonographic examination is of most benefit; in confirming varicose disease, making an assessment of the hemodynamics, and charting the progression of the disease and its response to treatment. It has become the reference standard for examining the condition and hemodynamics of the lower limb veins.
Particular veins of the deep venous system (DVS), and the superficial venous system (SVS) are looked at. The great saphenous vein (GSV), and the small saphenous vein (SSV) are superficial veins which drain into respectively, the common femoral vein and the popliteal vein. These veins are deep veins. Perforator veins drain superficial veins into the deep veins. Three anatomic compartments are described (as networks), (N1) containing the deep veins, (N2) containing the perforator veins, and (N3)  containing the superficial veins, known as the saphenous compartment. This compartmentalisation makes it easier for the examiner to systematize and map. The GSV can be located in the saphenous compartment where together with the Giacomini vein and the accessory saphenous vein (ASV)  an image resembling an eye, known as the 'eye sign' can be seen. The ASV which is often responsible for varicose veins, can be located at the 'alignment sign', where it is seen to align with the femoral vessels.

On ultrasound at the saphenofemoral junction in the groin, the common femoral vein (CFV) with the GSV and the common femoral artery (CFA) create an image called the Mickey Mouse sign. The CFV represents the head, and the CFA and GSV represent the ears. The examination report will include details of the deep and the superficial vein systems, and their mapping. The mapping is drawn on paper and then drawn on the patient before surgery.

The use of ultrasonography in a medical application was first used in the late 1940s in the United States. This use was soon followed in other countries with further research and development being carried out. The first report on Doppler ultrasound  as a diagnostic tool for vascular disease was published in 1967–1968. Rapid advances since then in electronics, has greatly improved ultrasound transmission tomography.

Medical uses 
It allows the examiner to evaluate the gross anatomy of the venous networks as well as the blood flow direction, which is crucial in determining vein pathology.  It has become the reference standard used in the assessment of the condition and hemodynamics of the veins of the lower limbs. The normal physiological blood flow is antegrade, flowing from the periphery towards the heart, so that the evidence of an opposite, retrograde flow might indicate a pathology. The presence of a reflux is likewise of note; a reflux when not isolated in a vein (as simply retrograde), means that the blood flow is bi-directional where once the flow had been only antegrade.

Risks
No contraindications are known for this examination. Ultrasonography does not involve the use of ionizing radiation, and the procedure is harmless and can be safely used on anybody of any age. A World Health Organization report published in 1998 supports this.

Preparation 
No preparation is normally necessary for this examination, but if a complementary study of abdominal veins is also required, the patient will be asked to fast for 12 hours beforehand. The sensitivity and specificity measurements are around 90%.

Equipment 

The ultrasound equipment must be of sufficiently high quality in order to give a correct image processing result, which can then provide invaluable information, mainly at the superficial level. It must be able to provide both color and Doppler imaging; technologies that developed alongside the development of ultrasound. The use of Doppler measurements which trace the echoes of the generated soundwaves received by the probe, enable the direction and the velocity of the blood flow, to be depicted. The overlay of color onto the Doppler information lets these images be seen more clearly.
The choice of a probe will depend on the depth needed to be studied. For example, the superficial venous system (SVS) can be very well examined using a high frequency probe of 12 MHz. For  patients who have thick adipose tissue a probe of 7.5 MHz will be required. Deep veins require probes of around 6 MHz whilst the abdominal vessels are better studied with probes of between 4 and 6 MHz. In summary, three probes are needed together with a top level scanner. Also, the proper use of the scanner calls for a high level of expertise, so that the examiner must be well qualified and experienced in order to give effective results. In contrast to arterial ultrasonography the wall of the vein is not relevant and importance is given to the hemodynamic conclusions that the examiner can obtain in order to provide a valuable report. (Hemodynamics is the study of blood flow and of the laws that govern the circulation of blood in the blood vessels). It follows that the  examiner knowledge of venous hemodynamics is crucial, which can be a real barrier to a radiologist untrained in this field, who might wish to carry out these examinations. Specialized training in venous ultrasonography is not undertaken in some countries, which undermines best practice, mainly when varicose veins need to be examined.

Mechanism 

Ultrasonography is based on the principle that sound can pass through human body tissues and is reflected by the tissue interfaces in the same way that light can reflect back on itself, from a mirror. Tissue in the body will offer varying degrees of resistance, known as acoustic impedance, to the path of the ultrasound beam. When there is a high impedance difference between two tissues, the interface between them will strongly reflect the sound. When the ultrasound beam meets air, or solid tissue such as bone, their  impedance difference is so great that most of the acoustic energy is reflected making it impossible to see any underlying structures. The examiner will see just a shadow, instead of the image expected. Air will impede sound waves which is why a gel is used. The gel prevents air bubbles from forming between the probe, and the patient's skin and so helps the conduction of the sound waves from the transducer into the body. The watery medium also helps to conduct the sound waves. Liquids, including blood have a low impedance, which means that little energy will be reflected and no visualization possible. One of the important exceptions is that when the blood flow is very slow it can in fact be seen, in what is termed "spontaneous contrast".

This technology is widely used in confirming venous pathology diagnoses. The imaging capability needed, was made possible with the developments of Doppler and color Doppler. Doppler measurements using Doppler effect can show the direction of the blood flow and its relative velocity and color Doppler is the provision of color to help interpret the image, showing for example, the blood flow towards the probe in one color and that flowing away another. Whilst the equipment itself is costly, the procedure is not. Apart from the scanner, different probes are required according to the depth to be studied. A gel is used with the probe to make a good acoustic impedance contact. The training and expertise of the examiner is important because of the many technical complications that can present. Venous anatomy for example, is not constant, for example a patient's vein layout of the right limb is not identical to that of the left limb.

The probe is an ultrasonic sensor,  generally known as a transducer, which functions to send and receive acoustic energy. The emission is generated on piezoelectric crystals by the piezoelectric effect. The reflected ultrasound is received by the probe, transformed into an electric impulse as voltage and sent to the engine for signal processing and conversion to an image on the screen. The depth reached by the ultrasound beam is dependent on the frequency of the probe used. The higher the frequency the lesser the depth reached.

Procedure 
The patient will need to be in an upright position to enable a proper study of blood flow direction

Chronic venous insufficiency is where the veins cannot pump enough blood back to the heart. It results when the vein dilates secondary to a vein wall disease or when normal functioning of the valves, which serve to keep blood flowing to the heart and to prevent reflux, become damaged and/or incompetent (the dilation of a vein will prevent valves to close properly). This incompetence will result in an reversed blood flow through the affected vein or veins. It can result in varicose veins, and in severe cases venous ulcer. The reversed blood pools in the low third of legs and feet.

Unlike the arterial ultrasound study, when the sonographer studies venous insufficiency, the vein wall itself has no relevance and attention will be focused on the direction of blood flow. The objective of the examination is to see how the veins drain. In this way, venous ultrasonography has at times become a hemodynamic examination which is reserved for experienced sonographers who have completed hemodynamic studies and training and have acquired a deep knowledge of this subject.

Also, unlike ultrasonography of deep venous thrombosis, the procedure focuses mainly on superficial veins.

Also, unlike the arterial ultrasound examination, blood velocity in veins has no diagnostic meaning. Veins are a draining system similar to a low pressure hydraulic system, with a laminar flow and a low velocity. This low velocity is responsible for the fact that it can only be detected spontaneously with the Doppler effect on the proximal and larger femoral and iliac veins. Here the flow is either modulated by the respiratory rhythm or is continuous in cases where the flow is high. The thinner veins do not have a spontaneous flow. However, in some circumstances the blood flow is so slow that it can be seen as some echogenic material moving within the vein, in "spontaneous contrast".  This material can easily be mistaken for a thrombus, but can also easily be discounted by testing the vein's compressibility.

To evidence the blood flow direction there are some techniques that the examiner can use to accelerate blood flow and show valvular function:

 Manual squeezing and releasing – the examiner can compress the vein below the probe which will push the blood in its normal antegrade direction. On releasing the pressure if the valves are incompetent the flow will appear as a retrograde flow or reflux, greater than 0.5 sec.

 Paraná maneuver makes use of a proprioceptive reflex to test venous muscle pump induced flow. (Proprioceptive refers to a response to a perceived stimulus especially with regard to movement and position of the body). A slight push to the waist, triggers a muscle contraction in the leg, in order to maintain posture. This maneuver is very useful for studying deep vein flow and detecting valvular incompetence, mainly at the popliteal vein level, (at the back of the knee) and to check perforator vein incompetence. It is very useful when legs are painful or very edematous (swollen with fluid).  
 Flexing the toes and feet and extending on tiptoes can all be very useful in detecting perforator vein incompetence. These movements unleash a muscle contraction which compresses deep veins. If a perforator valve is incompetent then a reflux from the deep to the superficial through the perforator vein will be registered.
 Valsalva maneuver – when the patient performs this maneuver, he or she, increases intra-abdominal venous pressure. If the great saphenous valve at the sapheno-femoral junction is incompetent, a reflux will appear.

Normal blood flow is antegrade (going to the heart), and from superficial to deep veins via perforator veins. However, there are two exceptions: firstly, the GSV collaterals, (the veins that run parallel), drain the abdominal wall and have a flow from top to bottom so that when an examiner tests the saphenofemoral junction, a false positive diagnosis might be made; secondly, in the flow from the sole of the foot venous network around 10% drains to the dorsal venous arch of the foot, going therefore against the norm, from deep to superficial veins.

Attention will be focused on the direction of the blood flow in both of the venous systems, and in the perforator veins, as well as being focused on shunt detection. A shunting of blood from the thigh veins back into the lower leg veins will give a reflux situation. The veins most often found to be incompetent are the saphenous veins and the perforators communicating with the deep veins of the thigh.

Technical difficulties 
Venous ultrasonography of the lower limbs is the most demanding of the medical complementary examinations. It is dependent on the examiner's expertise and training, and the interpretation of the results is subjective and reliant on an understanding of venous hemodynamics.  (A mapping does help the reproducibility and the inter-observer agreement of this examination). The examination is made even more difficult because there can be dilated veins without insufficiency, (by hyper-debit), and non dilated  but incompetent veins. Moreover, veins can be discretely incompetent in summer but then be normal in winter. Also, by definition of insufficiency, (insufficient blood flow) blood may be seen to flow freely in both directions, antegrade and retrograde between two valves. Another problem when dealing with the superficial venous system, is that venous anatomy is not constant; the position of veins can vary in different patients; also in the same patient the right lower limb is not identical to the left lower limb. As a further complication to the examination, where venous insufficiency is evidenced, the examination needs to be done with the probe in the transversal position but the mapping must be done showing the veins in their longitudinal aspect. This demands a rapid extrapolation by the physician from the transversal images seen to the longitudinal drawing needed. The dynamic maneuvers also need to be well executed. The need of a specialized training is mandatory which is a huge problem for many countries today.

Particular details

Great saphenous vein 

The GSV a superficial vein, is the longest vein in the body. It has its origin in the dorsal venous arch of the foot, a superficial vein which connects the small saphenous vein with the GSV. It travels up the leg and medial side of the thigh to reach the groin, where it drains into the common femoral vein. Along the length of the GSV, it receives  numerous tributaries, (from the subcutaneous layer) and drains into the deep veins via the perforator veins. When seen in a scan, the GSV and the Giacomini vein, together with the accessory saphenous vein (ASV), form an image resembling an eye which is referred to as the "eye sign" or "eye image". . All veins which are between the skin and the superficial fascia are tributaries and all veins which cross the deep fascia to join the deep venous system are perforator veins.

Three anatomic compartments can be described, as networks:
N1 contains the deep veins, also known as the deep compartment.
N2 is the superficial compartment or the saphenous compartment.
N3 is the epifascial compartment.
 
Some authors describe one more compartment N4, containing collaterals which form a bypass between two distinct points of the same vein.
This compartmentalization is useful in an ultrasonographic examination because it makes systematization, mapping execution, and any surgery strategic, easier.

Being protected between two fasciae, the superficial veins belonging to compartment N3 very rarely become sinuous. So that when a sinuous vein is detected, the sonographer will suspect that it is a tributary.
The sapheno-femoral junction is tested by the Valsalva maneuver with the use of color Doppler being helpful at this stage.

The wall thickness of the vein is significantly increased in venous reflux, being approximately 0.58 mm in venous reflux, compared to up to 0.45 mm normally.

Accessory saphenous vein 

The accessory saphenous vein (ASV), either anterior or posterior, is an important GSV collateral frequently responsible for varicose veins located on the anterior and lateral aspect of the thigh.
The anterior ASV is more anterior than the ASV and is outside the femoral vessels plan. The two veins terminate in a common trunk near the groin, the sapheno-femoral junction. Here, the ASV can be located  aligned with the femoral vessels at the "alignment sign". Also, at the groin it can be seen at the outside of the great saphenous vein, and together with the common femoral vein (CFV) these three create an image, the so-called "Mickey Mouse sign". Some authors, inspired by this sign (presented for the first time at CHIVA's 2002 meeting in Berlin), described a "Mickey Mouse view" at the groin, an image formed by the common femoral vein, the GSV and the superficial femoral artery. When the ASV is incompetent, its flow becomes retrograde and tries to drain in the superior fibular perforator, at the side of the knee, or sometimes it runs down towards the ankle to drain in the inferior fibular perforator.

Small saphenous vein 
The small saphenous vein (SSV), runs along the posterior aspect of the leg as far as the popliteal region, in the upper calf. Here it enters the popliteal space which is located between the two heads of the gastrocnemius muscle where it usually drains above the knee joint in the popliteal vein or a little less often in the GSV or other deep muscular veins of the thigh. The use of ultrasonography has allowed a number of variations to be shown at this level; when no contact is made with the popliteal vein it might be seen to drain in the GSV, at a variable level; or, it may merge with the Giacomini vein and drain in the GSV at the superior 1/3 of the thigh. It can also but rarely, drain in the vein of the semimembranosus (thigh muscle) (shown below). Usually though, it connects with a perforator vein at its middle 1/3. To check for insufficiency, the Paraná maneuver is very useful.

Giacomini vein 

The Giacomini vein mostly acts as a  bypass between  the GSV and SSV territories. Usually its flow is in the normal antegrade direction, from bottom to top. However it can become retrograde without pathology. For example, after a GSV stripping, laser ablation or after its ligation at the sapheno-femoral junction, the Giacomini vein will drain into the SSV, with a retrograde flow. When there is a GSV thrombosis or other cause of insufficiency, the Giacomini vein can divert the blood flow to the SSV and from there to the popliteal vein. Where surgery, other than stripping or laser ablation is intended, the examiner will make reference to the blood flow direction in this vein, as it will be of importance.

Perforator veins 

Perforator veins play a very special role in the venous system, carrying blood from superficial to deep veins. During the muscular systole their valves close and stop any blood flow coming from the deep to the superficial veins. When their valves become insufficient, they are responsible for a rapid deterioration in existing varicose disease and for the development of venous ulcers. Detection of insufficient perforators is important because they need to be ligatured. However, the detection of competent ones is as important because they may be used strategically in new techniques of conservative surgery, for example a minimally invasive CHIVA. The ultrasonography report will include insufficient and continent perforators, which will also be shown on venous mapping. To test these veins properly, the examiner will need to use some techniques like the Paraná maneuver, toe and foot flexion, and hyper-extension on tip toes.

Examination report

After performing this examination, the physician writes a report in which some points are crucial:
The condition of the deep vein system (DVS), its permeability and compressibility, and whether it is continent or insufficient;
The permeability and compressibility of the superficial vein system (SVS), the presence or absence of superficial insufficiency, and in which veins or vein segments;
Which perforator veins are continent or insufficient;
The presence or absence of shunts;
Mapping the insufficient veins, flux direction, shunts, and perforators.

This enables surgeons to plan interventions, in a stage known as virtual dissection. Drawn on paper, after the examination, it will be drawn over the patient's skin before surgery.

History 

The Doppler effect was first described by Christian Doppler in 1843. Nearly forty years later in 1880, the piezoelectric effect was discovered and confirmed by Pierre and Jacques Curie.  Both of these findings were used in the development of ultrasonography. The first ultrasound was applied to the human body for medical purposes by Dr. George Ludwig, University of Pennsylvania, in the late 1940s.

The use of ultrasonography in medicine soon followed in different locations around the world. In the mid-1950s more research was undertaken by Professor Ian Donald et al., in Glasgow, which advanced the practical technology and applications of ultrasound. In 1963, in France, Léandre Pourcelot started on his thesis, which was presented in 1964, and used pulsed Doppler for blood flow calculation as its subject. This was followed up by Peronneau in 1969. Dr. Gene Strandness and the bio-engineering group at the University of Washington who conducted research on Doppler ultrasound as a diagnostic tool for vascular disease, published their first work in 1967. The first report published about the venous system appeared around 1967–1968. A few years later in 1977, Claude Franceschi published the very first book about vascular ultrasonography, L’investigation vasculaire par ultrasonographie Doppler.

From the 1960s commercially available systems were introduced. Soon, other advances in electronics and piezoelectric materials enabled further improvements which meant that ultrasound was quickly adopted for use in medicine due to its rapid, accurate diagnostic capabilities which offered the possibility of prompt treatment. Alongside the improving imaging technology, acoustic Doppler velocimetry and medical ultrasonography color Doppler were developed, which have had a significant impact on many specialties, including radiology, obstetrics, gynecology, angiology and cardiology, and have provided even greater scope for ultrasound investigations. Since 1970, real-time scanners and pulsed Doppler, have enabled the use of  ultrasound to study the function of the venous system. The first demonstration of color Doppler was achieved by Geoff Stevenson.
Further progress in the 1970s was made with the arrival of the microchip, and the ensuing exponential increase in processing power has meant the development of fast and powerful systems. These systems involving digital beamforming and greater signal enhancement, have introduced new methods of interpreting and displaying data 

Rapid technical advancements in transmission tomography made possible the very good specificity and sensitivity capability of this technique, enabling the possibility of properly seeing the superficial tissues.

Footnotes

References

Bibliography

 

 

 

 

Medical ultrasonography
Diseases of veins, lymphatic vessels and lymph nodes